Granigyra is a genus of sea snails, marine gastropod mollusks, unassigned in the superfamily Seguenzioidea.

Species
Species within the genus Granigyra include:

 Granigyra arenosa Warén, 1993
 Granigyra filosa (Dall, 1919)
 Granigyra granulifera Warén, 1992
 Granigyra inflata (Warén, 1992)
 Granigyra limata (Dall, 1889)
 Granigyra nipponica (Okutani, 1964)
 Granigyra oblatogyra De Souza & Pimenta, 2002
 Granigyra piona (Dall, 1919)
 Granigyra pruinosa (Jeffreys, 1883)
 Granigyra radiata Dall, 1927
 Granigyra spinulosa Bush, 1897
 Granigyra tenera (Jeffreys, 1883)
 Granigyra typica Thiele, 1925
Species brought into synonymy
 Granigyra monterosatoi (van Aartsen & Bogi, 1986): synonym of Rugulina monterosatoi (van Aartsen & Bogi, 1986)

References

 Thiele J. (1925). Gastropoden der Deutschen Tiefsee-Expedition. II Teil. Wissenschaftliche Ergebnisse der Deutschen Tiefsee-Expedition auf dem Dampfer "Valdivia" 1898-1899. 17(2): 35-382, pls 13-46 
 Gofas, S.; Le Renard, J.; Bouchet, P. (2001). Mollusca, in: Costello, M.J. et al. (Ed.) (2001). European register of marine species: a check-list of the marine species in Europe and a bibliography of guides to their identification. Collection Patrimoines Naturels, 50: pp. 180–213 
 Spencer, H.; Marshall. B. (2009). All Mollusca except Opisthobranchia. In: Gordon, D. (Ed.) (2009). New Zealand Inventory of Biodiversity. Volume One: Kingdom Animalia. 584 pp

External links
 Dall W.H. 1889. Reports on the results of dredging, under the supervision of Alexander Agassiz, in the Gulf of Mexico (1877-78) and in the Caribbean Sea (1879-80), by the U.S. Coast Survey Steamer "Blake", Lieut.-Commander C.D. Sigsbee, U.S.N., and Commander J.R. Bartlett, U.S.N., commanding. XXIX. Report on the Mollusca. Part 2, Gastropoda and Scaphopoda. Bulletin of the Museum of Comparative Zoölogy at Harvard College, 18: 1-492, pls. 10-40.
 Kano, Y.; Chikyu, E.; Warén, A. (2009). Morphological, ecological and molecular characterization of the enigmatic planispiral snail genus Adeuomphalus (Vetigastropoda: Seguenzioidea. Journal of Molluscan Studies. 75(4): 397-418